Kokkireni is a village in Munagala Mandal, Suryapet district, Telangana, India.

Demographics
Per the 2011 Census of India, Kokkireni has a total population of 2261 ; of whom 1147 are male and 1114 female.

References

Villages in Suryapet district